Kabkabad (also Romanized as Kabkābād; also known as Komakābād) is a village in Sheshdeh Rural District, Sheshdeh and Qarah Bulaq District, Fasa County, Fars Province, Iran. At the 2006 census, its population was 1,294, in 330 families.

References 

Populated places in Fasa County